Albert Edgar Hickman (August 2, 1875 – February 9, 1943) was the seventeenth Prime Minister of Newfoundland and has the distinction of having served the shortest term of any Prime Minister.

Biography
Albert Hickman was born in Grand Bank on August 2, 1875. He married Mary Louise Laurie on December 24, 1906, and they had three children.

A politician and businessman, he served as Prime Minister of Newfoundland for 33 days in 1924 as leader of a caretaker administration after the successive collapses of the Liberal Reform Party governments of Prime Ministers Sir Richard Squires and William Warren. The governor asked  Hickman to form an administration to govern the province when the government of  William Warren was defeated in a Motion of No Confidence. Hickman invited members of various former members of the Liberal Reform Party as well as members of other parties  into his government which he called the Liberal-Progressive Party. His new party was defeated in the 9 June 1924 election by former supporters of Warren who joined with the conservative opposition to form the Liberal-Conservative Progressive Party. Hickman served as Leader of the Opposition until he retired from politics in 1928, by which time his party had degenerated and a new Liberal Party had emerged led by Squires.

Albert Hickman died at his home in St. John's on February 9, 1943.

References

External links
Newfoundland in the 1920s

1875 births
1943 deaths
Prime Ministers of the Dominion of Newfoundland
People from Grand Bank